Norman Finkelstein (born 1954) is an American poet and literary critic. He has written extensively about modern and postmodern poetry and about Jewish American literature. According to Tablet Magazine, Finkelstein's poetry "is simultaneously secular and religious, stately and conversational, prophetic, and circumspect."

Finkelstein was born in New York City. He earned his B.A. from Binghamton University and his Ph.D. from Emory University. He was a Professor of English at Xavier University in Cincinnati, Ohio., retiring in April 2020

Books of poetry
 The Objects In Your Life (House of Keys, Atlanta, 1977)
 Restless Messengers (Georgia, 1992)
 Track: three volumes. Track (Spuyten Duyvil, 1999), Columns (Spuyten Duyvil, 2002), and Powers (Spuyten Duyvil, 2005)
 Passing Over (Marsh Hawk Press, 2007)
 Scribe (Dos Madres Press, 2009)
 Inside the Ghost Factory (Marsh Hawk Press, 2010)
 Track (complete poem in one volume, Shearsman Books, 2012)

Books of literary criticism
 The Utopian Moment in Contemporary American Literature (Bucknell, 1988, 1993)
 The Ritual of New Creation: Jewish Tradition and Contemporary Literature (SUNY, 1992)
 Not One of Them In Place: Modern Poetry and Jewish American Identity (SUNY, 2002)
  Lyrical Interference: Essays on Poetics (Spuyten Duyvil, 2004)
 On Mount Vision: Forms of the Sacred In Contemporary American Poetry (Iowa, 2010)

References

Further reading
Review of Scribe by Robert Archambeau in The Offending Adam.
Review of Track by Peter O'Leary in The Volta.
Review of Track by Henry Weinfield in Notre Dame Review.
Henry Weinfield, "Passing Through" [review of Passing Over], Shofar 27.3 (Spring 2009): 151-155.
Burt Kimmelman, "Objectivist Poetics Since 1970" in The World In Time and Space: Toward a History of Innovative American Poetry in Our Time, ed. Edward Foster and Joseph Donahue (Talisman House, 2002), 161-184.
Eric Murphy Selinger, "Azoy Toot a Yid: Secular Poetics and 'The Jewish Way,'" in Radical Poetics and Secular Jewish Culture, ed. Stephen Paul Miller and Daniel Morris (Alabama, 2010), 354-377.

External links

Finkelstein page at PennSound

Living people
American male poets
American literary critics
Binghamton University alumni
Emory University alumni
1954 births
American male non-fiction writers